The Royal Tank Regiment Memorial is a sculpture by Vivien Mallock in Whitehall Court, London. It commemorates the Royal Tank Regiment.

The sculptural group depicts the five-man crew of a World War II-era Comet tank at 1½ times life size. General Sir Antony Walker, who was in charge of fundraising for the memorial, described it as "a memorial to the men of the regiment, rather than the machines". It is an enlarged version of a maquette by George Henry Paulin in the Tank Museum, Bovington, Dorset, which dates to 1953. Mallock's husband had been an officer in the RTR in the 1960s. A resin cast of Mallock's group also stands outside the Tank Museum.

The memorial was unveiled by Queen Elizabeth II, Colonel-in-Chief of the RTR, on 13 June 2000. She was escorted to the ceremony by an armoured Rolls-Royce from 1924, a precursor to the tank. The date was the centenary of a battle in the Second Boer War in which the tank pioneer Sir Ernest Dunlop Swinton took part. Other memorials to the RTR are in Newcastle-upon-Tyne and the National Memorial Arboretum in Alrewas, Staffordshire.

Gallery

References

External links
 

Memorial
Military memorials in London
2000 sculptures
2000 in London
2000 establishments in England
Outdoor sculptures in London
Whitehall